Doriopsilla tishae is a species of dorid nudibranch, a colourful sea slug, a shell-less marine gastropod mollusc in the family Dendrodorididae.

Distribution
This species was described from Roatán, Honduras, Caribbean Sea with additional specimens from Guanaja, Honduras.

References

Dendrodorididae
Gastropods described in 2008